Robopon 2 Ring Version and Robopon 2 Cross Version are video games published by Atlus and released for the Game Boy Advance in 2001–2002. They are sequels to the Game Boy Color game Robopon. Their simultaneous release is similar to how the Pokémon series of video games are released in pairs of games (such as Pokémon Red and Blue) to promote inter-connectivity between them.

The games are a sequel to the earlier 2000 Game Boy Color game Robopon Sun. The Robopon bears much similarity to Nintendo's series of Pokémon games, and thus is often considered to be a Pokémon clone, but also bears similarity to the lesser known Super Nintendo Entertainment System game Robotrek, released by the Japanese game company Enix (now Square Enix).

Story
After the events of the first game, the now number one Legend of Porombo Island, Cody, sets out for new lands and new titles, but forgets his Robopon. Before he can turn back to retrieve them, his boat is wrecked in a storm, and he washes up on the continent of Majiko. He decides to become the Robopon champion of this land; however, in order to do this, he must obtain the one-of-a-kind XStones and challenge the rank-holders of Majiko. As he collects the XStones, however, he finds the towns of Majiko are troubled by events past and present, and he must travel between the world of 20 years ago and the present to make things right.

Gameplay
Within both versions of Robopon 2, Robopon can be created by finding different types of batteries and combining them (this process in known as "sparking"). Each different combination of batteries produces a different type of Robopon. Robopon 2 also builds upon the battle system of the first game by implementing four-on-four battles, allowing the player's whole party of Robopons to participate in one big battle. Subsequently, targeting certain enemies within battles becomes crucial. Another less drastic change from Robopon is the ability to change the colour of the player's Robopon.

Reception

Both Robopon 2 games received "average" reviews according to video game review aggregator Metacritic. GameSpot named Robopon 2 the second-best Game Boy Advance game of August 2002.

Notes

References

External links

2001 video games
Game Boy Advance games
Game Boy Advance-only games
Hudson Soft games
Multiplayer and single-player video games
Robopon
Video games about robots
Role-playing video games
Video games developed in Japan
Video games with alternative versions

ja:ロボットポンコッツ